Heinui Marama Amau (born 13 January 1991) is a Tahitian footballer who plays as a defender for A.S. Vénus and the Tahiti national football team.

Career

International
Amau made his senior international debut on 23 March 2017, coming on as a 30th-minute substitute for Taumihau Tiatia in a 3-1 victory over Papua New Guinea during World Cup qualifying.

References

External links

1991 births
Living people
French Polynesian footballers
Tahiti international footballers
Association football defenders